Drage is a settlement in the foothills of the Gorjanci range in the Municipality of Metlika in southeastern Slovenia. The entire area is part of the traditional region of Lower Carniola and is now included in the Southeast Slovenia Statistical Region.

There is a small Greek Catholic church in the village, one of only two churches of this rite in Slovenia (the second is in Metlika). It is dedicated to the Nativity of the Theotokos and was built in the early 20th century.

References

External links
Drage on Geopedia

Populated places in the Municipality of Metlika